Donát Ferenc Zsótér (born 6 January 1996 in Szeged) is a Hungarian footballer who plays for Budapest Honvéd as a winger. He was also part of the Hungarian U-19 at the 2014 UEFA European Under-19 Championship and  U-20 team at the 2015 FIFA U-20 World Cup.

Club statistics

References

External links
 MLSZ
 

1996 births
Living people
Sportspeople from Szeged
Hungarian footballers
Hungary youth international footballers
Association football midfielders
Fehérvár FC players
Szolnoki MÁV FC footballers
Dunaújváros PASE players
Puskás Akadémia FC players
Újpest FC players
Nemzeti Bajnokság I players
Budapest Honvéd FC players